Tavapadon (developmental code names CVL-751, PF-6649751, PF-06649751) is a dopamine receptor agonist which is under development by Pfizer and Cerevel Therapeutics for the treatment of Parkinson's disease. It acts as a selective partial agonist of the dopamine D1 (Ki = 8.54 nM) and D5 receptors. It also shows biased agonism for Gs-coupled signaling. As of July 2021, tavapadon is in phase 3 clinical trials for Parkinson's disease.

See also
 CVL-871

References

Biased ligands
D1-receptor agonists
D5 receptor agonists
Diketones
Experimental drugs
Pyridines
Pyrimidines
Trifluoromethyl compounds